The Imported Bridegroom, and Other Stories of the New York Ghetto is a book by Abraham Cahan. First published in 1898 by Houghton Mifflin Company it was composed of five stories. The title story was adapted into a movie of the same name by Pamela Berger which was released in 1990.

Summary
The book is composed of five stories, all set in New York City 

Imported Bridegroom	
A Providential Match
A Sweat-Shop Romance
Circumstances
A Ghetto Wedding

References

External links
Primary sources
THE IMPORTED BRIDEGROOM AND OTHER STORIES OF THE NEW YORK GHETTO at Project Gutenberg (1898 book version)

1898 short story collections
Jewish American short story collections
Books about Jews and Judaism
Short stories set in New York City
Jews and Judaism in New York City
Houghton Mifflin books